Colby Schwartz (born April 8, 1974) is an American politician who served in the Oklahoma House of Representatives from the 43rd district from 2006 to 2014.

References

1974 births
Living people
Republican Party members of the Oklahoma House of Representatives